"On and On" is a song by American singer-songwriter Stephen Bishop. The song, from his debut album Careless, became a major hit, peaking at number 11 on the U.S. Billboard Hot 100 and spending 28 weeks on the chart. In Canada, the song peaked at number 6.

On the U.S. Easy Listening chart, "On and On" peaked at number two.  It reached number three on the corresponding Canadian chart.

Despite failing to crack the top ten, it was the 30th ranked single on the Billboard magazine year-end chart for 1977 as a result of its almost seven-month chart run.

Personnel 
 Stephen Bishop – lead and backing vocals, acoustic guitar
 John Barlow Jarvis – electric piano
 Andrew Gold – electric guitar
 Michael Staton – steel guitar
 Mac Cridlin – bass
 Larry Brown – drums
 Victor Feldman – percussion, vibraphone, marimba

Track listing
US 7" single
A. "On and On" - 3:00
B. "Little Italy" - 3:35

Chart performance

Weekly charts

Year-end charts

Popular culture

The song was featured in the films:
Anger Management
How to Deal 
The Hitcher
Margot at the Wedding
My Friend Dahmer
Remarkable Power.

Cover versions
 Kenny Rankin covered "On and On" in 1977. His version charted concurrently with Stephen Bishop's original, reaching No. 110 on the U.S. Billboard Bubbling Under chart.
 British reggae group Aswad took their version of the song to No. 25 in the UK in August 1989.

References

External links
 Lyrics of this song
 

1976 songs
1977 singles
Stephen Bishop (singer) songs
Aswad (band) songs
ABC Records singles
Songs about Jamaica
Songs written by Stephen Bishop (singer)